Debora Juarez is an American lawyer and politician serving as the president of the Seattle City Council. She was first elected in 2015 to represent the 5th district. A member of the Blackfeet Nation, she was the first Native American person elected to the council.

Early life and education 
Juarez is an enrolled member of the Blackfeet Nation. She grew up on the Puyallup Reservation in Tacoma, Washington with her five siblings. Her mother was Native American and her father was a first-generation Mexican-American.

Juarez was the first member of her family to attend college. She earned an undergraduate degree at Western Washington University and then a JD from Seattle University School of Law.

Career 
Juarez began working as a public defender while attending law school at night. She spent five years as a public defender and then worked an attorney for the Native American Project. She served two years as a King County Superior Court and City of Seattle Municipal Court pro-tem judge, and was the executive director of the Governor's Office of Indian Affairs under Mike Lowry and Gary Locke.

City Council 
In 2015, Juarez was elected to the Seattle City Council's District 5 position, which represents the north end of Seattle. She was sworn in by her two daughters and a niece on Monday January 4, 2016. Near the end of her first year in office, Crosscut.com described Juarez as a "wildcard councilmember" for her voting record and manner of "speaking more bluntly than most politicians would". Juarez was reelected to City Council District 5 in 2019, winning with 60.59% of the vote over Ann Davison.

As a councilmember, Juarez is well-known for focusing on her district and advocating for major capital projects, including the Northgate Pedestrian and Bicycle Bridge over I-5 and a controversial police station in her district. After members of the council were criticized for a 2016 vote against a street vacation necessary for a new arena to be built in the SoDo area, Juarez took a lead in the redevelopment of the Seattle Center Arena and was appointed chair of the Select Committee on Civic Arenas. In September 2018, the council unanimously approved a renovation of the arena with plans to attract a NHL team to the city.

Personal life 
Juarez lives in the Pinehurst neighborhood of Seattle.

In 2012, Juarez pleaded guilty to driving under the influence after crashing her car in Seattle's Northgate neighborhood.

Electoral history

2015 election

2019 election

References

External links
 Debora Juarez's Seattle City Council webpage

Living people
Year of birth missing (living people)
Blackfeet Nation people
Seattle City Council members
Women city councillors in Washington (state)
Native American women in politics
Native American city councillors
21st-century American women politicians
21st-century American politicians
American politicians of Mexican descent
Hispanic and Latino American women in politics
Western Washington University alumni
Seattle University School of Law alumni
Public defenders